Březnice may refer to places in the Czech Republic:

Březnice (Příbram District), a town in the Central Bohemian Region
Březnice (Tábor District), a municipality and village in the South Bohemian Region
Březnice (Zlín District), a municipality and village in the Zlín Region

See also
Breznica (disambiguation)
Breznița (disambiguation)